Casuarina cunninghamiana, commonly known as river oak or river she-oak, is a she-oak species of the genus Casuarina. The native range in Australia extends from Daly River in the Northern Territory, north and east in Queensland and eastern New South Wales.

Description

The trunk is usually erect, with dense rough bark. Flowers are reddish-brown in the male and red in the female.

Habitat
Trees are usually found in sunny locations along stream banks and swampy areas. It's widely recognised as an important tree for stabilising riverbanks and for soil erosion prevention accepting wet and dry soils. The foliage is quite palatable to stock. It is useful on windy sites and is also suited to coastal areas. C. cunninghamiana has been introduced into several other countries for the purpose of agroforestry.

Subspecies
There are two subspecies:
C. cunninghamiana subsp. cunninghamiana. Eastern New South Wales, north and east Queensland.
C. cunninghamiana subsp. miodon. Daly River and Arnhem Land in the Northern Territory and the Gulf of Carpentaria in Queensland.

The species has many common names including River Oak, River She-oak or Creek Oak.

Invasive species
Casuarina cunninghamiana is an invasive species in the Everglades in Florida and in South Africa.

References

External links
 Australian Biological Resources Study
 GBIF: Casuarina cunninghamiana (showing occurrence data and further images)

cunninghamiana
Trees of Australia
Fagales of Australia
Flora of Queensland
Flora of New South Wales
Drought-tolerant trees